Mainak Bhaumik is a Bengali film director and editor. He made his directorial debut with 2006 Bengali film Aamra.In 2012, he made another Bengali film Bedroom, a dark ensemble film about the new generation of young Indians. His critically and commercially successful movies are Maach Mishti & More, Bibaho Diaries, Generation Ami, Cheeni, Ekannoborti.

Biography 
Bhaumik started his career in 1998 by directing a short film His Life - Her Story which won an award at Florida Film Festival. In 2006 he made his first Bengali film Aamra. In 2012, he made another Bengali film Bedroom, a dark ensemble film about the new generation of young Indians who struggle with depression, failure and identity crises in a Facebook savvy world that is obsessed with picture perfect lives. In 2013, Bhaumik released the feature film Maach Mishti and More (Fish, Sweets and More)which he refers to as his 'love-letter' to his city of Kolkata (Bengal) telling the story of the loves and lives of three brothers in a Bengali family. Also released in 2013 was Aami Aar Amaar Girlfriends (Me and My Girlfriends) a coming-of-age movie about the lives of three Indian girls who cling to their friendship in times of trouble. While celebrating the lighter side of 'girl world', the film also ventures into a darker slice of life, with the main plot of a school teacher who has an extra-marital affair with one of her students, who is a minor. In 2014, his feature film Take One, is about a modern Indian woman, an actress who plays the Hindu mythological character Sita, and is judged harshly by Indian society because of her sexual indiscretions. But unlike Sita, who was forced by society into exile, the actress rejects hypocritical society's unfair judgment of her and withdraws voluntarily into her private exile.

Bhaumik is an international award winning documentary filmmaker, and is one of the leading feature filmmakers in the Indian Bengali film industry today. His hard hitting documentary films on endangered Indian ethnic folk art forms and culture are internationally distributed by the reputed Documentary Educational Resources in Boston in collaboration with the Smithsonian Institution. These international award winning films have been screened in numerous international film festivals across the globe, and have also been picked up by German Films Italia, Rome, for the Italian TV rights. He started off his career by winning the Best Short Film award for his film "His Life - Her Story", at the Florida Film Festival in 1998, and then won the Art Award in 2005 for his documentary film titled "Gone to Pat", in Washington D.C., at the Society for Visual Anthropology, American Anthropological Association. Since then, his feature films too have earned critical acclaim and achieved box office success with nationwide and international theatrical releases. A student of Economics and Computer Science, Bhaumik graduated with a double major from City University of New York, and then enrolled in Columbia University for the M.A./PhD program in Literature. Also a student of film production from New York Film Academy, and Film and Video Editing at New School University, Bhaumik calls both New York and Kolkata (Bengal, India) his home. Having grown up in both cities, he's enjoyed the 'best of both worlds' with opportunities like taking screenwriting workshops with Pulitzer Prize winning playwright, David Mamet; as well as living in close quarters with and filming the lives of Indian ethnic folk artisans such as the Patua Artists of Midnapore, the Baul Singers of Bengal and the Chhau Dancers of Purulia.

Filmography

Direction 
 Feature films

 Aamra (2006)
 Bedroom (2012)
 Maach Mishti & More (2013)
 Ami Aar Amar Girlfriends (2013)
 Take One (2014)
 Kolkata Calling (2014)
 Family Album (2015)
 Bibaho Diaries (2017)
 Chawlochhitro Circus (2017)
 Ghare & Baire (2018)
 Happy Pill (2018)
 Aami vs Tumi (a hoichoi original 2018)
 Generation Ami (2018)
 Bornoporichoy (2019)
 Goyenda Junior (2019)
 Cheeni (2020)
 Ekannoborti (2021)
 Mini (2022)
 Cheeni 2 (2023)
 Web Series
 Break Up Story
 Maradonar Juto
 Short film / Documentary
 His Life - Her Story
 Gone to Pat
 Surviving Chau
 Melting Wok

Editor 
 The Bong Connection (2006)
 Chalo Let's Go (2008)
 Arekti Premer Golpo (2010)
 Shabdo (2012)

See also 
 Agnidev Chatterjee

References

External links 
 

Living people
Bengali film directors
Film directors from Kolkata
21st-century Indian film directors
Year of birth missing (living people)